The Savoia-Marchetti S.55 was a double-hulled flying boat produced in Italy, beginning in 1924. Shortly after its introduction, it began setting records for speed, payload, altitude and range.

Design and development
The S.55 featured many innovative design features. All the passengers or cargo were placed in the twin hulls, but the pilot and crew captained the plane from a cockpit in the thicker section of the wing, between the two hulls. The S.55 had two inline contra-rotating propellers, mounted in tandem. The engines were canted sharply at an upward angle. Two wire-braced booms connected the triple-finned tail structure to the twin hulls and wing.

Operational history

Even though its design was unusual, the Savoia-Marchetti S.55 was a remarkably airworthy craft. In 1926, the S.55P prototype set 14 world records for speed, altitude and distance with a payload. The S.55's greatest successes, however, were its many flights between Europe and the Americas.

The first staged south Atlantic Ocean crossing was made in 1922 using three different Fairey III machines and the Dornier Do J Plus Ultra crossed in January 1926 with a single stop at the Cape Verde Islands.

The first S.55 crossing was made a year later by the Santa Maria under Francesco de Pinedo. After flying south to Bolama, at that time in Portuguese Guinea, they hoped to cross the ocean without another stop but were forced down at Cape Verde, reaching  Brazil on 23 February 1927. After the crossing, the aircraft was traded to Brazil for coffee beans.

The Brazilian João Ribeiro de Barros and his crew of three made another crossing in S.55 "Jahú" on 24 April 1927. Departing from Santiago Island, he crossed the Atlantic in "Jahú" and landed at Fernando de Noronha Island, Brazil.

Pilots Francesco de Pinedo and Carlo del Prete took off from Sesto Calende, Italy, in an S-55 on 13 February 1927.

On 20 June 1928 Savoia-Marchetti S.55 I-SAAT Santa Maria, piloted by  Ten. Col. Umberto Maddalena of the Italian air force, located survivors of Arctic explorer Umberto Nobile's crashed airship Italia on an ice floe about 120 km (75 mi) northeast of Nordaustlandet, Svalbard.

The Italian Air Marshal of the time, Italo Balbo, became famous for organizing a squadron of S.55s for Atlantic crossings, culminating in his 1933 flight with 24 aircraft to Chicago's Century of Progress International Exposition. On 1 July 1933, General Balbo commanded a flight of S-55s from Orbetello, Italy, completing the flight in just over 48 hours, maintaining a tight "V" formation. These large fleets of aircraft were sometimes called a "Balbo".

The aircraft went on to serve in the Regia Aeronautica as a long-range bomber and patrol aircraft, but by World War II, the last S.55s were no longer serviceable and were in reserve.

Variants
 S.55
Prototypes and original production model delivered from 1927 to 1930, 90 built, including two prototypes.
 S.55C
Civil variant delivered from 1925 to 1926, eight built.

 S.55P
Improved civil variant with enlarged hull for ten passengers and enclosed cockpits delivered from 1928 to 1932, 23 built.
 S.55A
Military variant delivered with 418 kW (560 hp) Fiat A.22R engines, 16 built.
 S.55M
Variant with some wood structures replaced by metal, seven built by Piaggio in 1930.
 S.55 Scafo Allargato
Widened and deepened hull and enclosed cockpits, 16 built by Savoia-Marchetti and 16 built by CANT.
 S.55 Scafo Allargatissimo
Variant with greatly enlarged hull, 20 built by Savoia-Marchetti, 16 built by Macchi and six built by CANT.
 S.55X
Variant fitted with Isotta Fraschini Asso 750 engines for North Atlantic formation flights, later armed and used as a reconnaissance-bomber. 25 built.

Operators

Civil operators
 
 Aero Espresso Italiana
 Società Aerea Mediterranea

 Aeroflot

 Aero Transport Company d.b.a. AirVia.
 Marine Air Transport Co.
 Alaska Airways

Military operators
 
 Regia Aeronautica
 
 Brazilian Navy (8 airplanes)
  Spain (1937)
 Spanish Air Force
 
 Royal Romanian Naval Aviation (7 units)

Surviving aircraft

The last remaining example is preserved in Brazil, at the TAM "Asas de um sonho" museum, at São Carlos, São Paulo. The aircraft, registered I-BAUQ and named "Jahú", was the S.55 used by Commander João Ribeiro de Barros in his crossing of the South Atlantic in 1927.

Specifications (S.55)

See also

References

Bibliography

External links

 Savoia-Marchetti S-55 

S.55
1920s Italian airliners
1920s Italian patrol aircraft
Flying boats
Twin-fuselage aircraft
Twin-engined push-pull aircraft
High-wing aircraft
Transatlantic flight
Aircraft first flown in 1924